Aïn Djasser District is a district of Batna Province, Algeria.

Municipalities
The district further divides into two municipalities:
Aïn Djasser
El Hassi

References 

Districts of Batna Province